The Roman Catholic Church in Bangladesh is composed solely of a Latin hierarchy, joint in the national Episcopal Conference of Bangladesh (the former East Pakistan), comprising only two Latin ecclesiastical provinces, under the Metropolitans of the Archdioceses of Dhaka and of Chittagong, which together have a total of six suffragan dioceses.
 
Unlike India, there are no Eastern Catholic sees. Neither are there pre-diocesan or other exempt jurisdictions. There are no titular sees, nor defunct jurisdictions without current successor sees.

There is an Apostolic Nunciature to Bangladesh as papal diplomatic representation (embassy-level).

List of dioceses

See also 
 List of Catholic dioceses (structured view)

References

External links 
 GCatholic.org - data for all sections.
 Catholic-Hierarchy

Bangladesh
Catholic dioceses